The Combat Divers Groupment, abbreviated to GRUMEC, is a special operations and Counterterrorism unit of the Brazilian Navy.

The GRUMEC was created in 1974 and is subordinate to the Submarine Force, which provides the primary means of transport for combat diver missions. GRUMEC teams can be transported to the target by a submarine, from which they can reach the target by swimming, in kayaks, or in inflatable boats that can be launched from the submarine while it is still under water. The GRUMEC can also reach the target by parachute or helicopter.

The function of the GRUMEC is to infiltrate undetected in coastal and riverine environments in order to perform tasks such as reconnaissance, sabotage and the elimination of targets of strategic value. In this sense it is similar to the U.S. Navy SEALs and British Special Boat Service.

A member of the force is known as a "MEC", which is an abbreviation of "", meaning "combat diver".

Formation

The Brazilian Navy Combat Diver's indoctrination and training methods are similar to other combat diver units such as the American SEALs, British SBS (Special Boat Service) or the Commando Hubert of the French Navy Commandos Marine. The course is conducted in the MEC Cry.

For officers of the Navy, the initial requirements include passing medical and psychological examinations, testing in a recompression chamber and arduous physical tests. The call CAMECO (Enhancement Course of Combat Diver for Officers) lasts 46 weeks, is divided into four phases and aims to enable the military to operate diving equipment, weapons, explosives, tactics and techniques used for unconventional warfare and conflict low intensity, enabling them to perform, in short, the various types of Special Operations. Officers, of course, special emphasis is given to planning operations, but as a whole, the materials include: physical training and military defense; hygiene and first aid campaign, self-contained open-circuit, fighting techniques, riverine operations, demolition, weapons, communications, shore reconnaissance, submarine special operations, military planning process and case study, contemporary management, leadership; introduction to microcomputers, communications system of the Navy, and Intelligence.

For enlisted (corporals or male sergeants with less than 30 years of age and able to reenlist), there is a C-ESP-MEC - Combat Divers Special Course, whose requirements for admission are the same as CAMECO. The duration is 45 weeks of instructional activities also drawn as to the officers, but those who endure the enormous physical and mental pressure of the course will be adequately prepared for the specialized tasks assigned to MECS.

Throughout the period of the course, MEC candidates are submitted to extreme physical and psychological hardships, and emphasized the attributes of combat leadership, wisdom, objectivity, improvisation, serene environment when subjected to high risks or stress, among other. The weather is always kept as close as possible to what would be found in a real operational situation. The pressure is constant so that, typically, a group that started the course, only about 10 to 20 percent receive final approval and with it the coveted wings (badge). All applicants are volunteers and may request the termination of the activity at any time. Clam also gives the C-EXP-MAUT-GAS-Diver Course Expedito of Closed-Circuit, available for both official and squares that have been judged fit to psychophysical control annual swim (or equivalent examination) for less than one year. Its duration is four weeks and is open also for military Marine Corps, Army and Air Force. It is always important to emphasize that the techniques of closed-circuit scuba diving with equipment that does not produce bubbles, are essential for most jobs in special operations, thanks to the discretion, silence and invisibility of the virtual operators to visual observation and detection by the enemy.

After graduating the course, the sailor is called to serve in GRUMEC, where he has a full complement of training program and conduct advanced courses and internships in various areas such as deactivation of explosive devices (EOD), basic skydiving (static line jump), jumpmaster, HALO jump, HALO jumpmaster, precursor paratrooper (PREC), folding, maintenance and supplies by air (DOMPSA) stage basic mountaineering course in jungle operations, operational stage in the Pantanal, stage sniper (sniper), among others.

Training and exchange 

Day-to-day life for members of GRUMEC constitutes a countless array of activities, and mixed among the inevitable administrative tasks, are training, retraining and exercise. In "Operation Dragon" they perform hydrographic reconnaissance and gather information about the surf, training of patrols, terrestrial orientation, infiltration dipped, parachute jumping (free, or semi-automatic), release and collection of personnel and materiel by helicopters, submarines and surface ships;

The MECS have participated in all fleet amphibious operations in support of launching torpedoes and missiles, riverine operations in the Amazon and the Pantanal, as well as the constant exercise of recovery ships and oil platforms.

Aiming to keep up with the state of the art worldwide, the group has conducted exchanges with their counterparts in friendly countries. Among them Operation "Unitas", where they operated with the U.S. Navy SEALs.

Chronology
1964: The first Brazilian MECs (Mergulhadores de Combate = Combat Divers) were two officers and two privates who had been through the USA UDT-SEALs course.
1970: From their experience, the Divisão de Mergulhadores de Combate (= Combat Divers Division) was created in the "Base Almirante Castro e Silva".
1971: Two more officers and three privates qualified for the French Navy as "nageurs de combat".
1974: At what is now the Centro de Instrução e Adestramento Almirante Áttila Monteiro Aché (CIAMA) in Brazil was trained the first group of combat divers.
1983: Because this frogman unit were getting more calls, Combat Divers Division was transformed into GRUMEC, as an integral part of the Comando da Força de Submarinos (= Submarine Force Command).
1997 December 12: The Minister of the Navy created GRUMEC, whose headquarters are in Rio de Janeiro city and is directly subordinate to the Submarine Force Command.
1998 March 10: GRUMEC was activated.

External links
 O Globo article

Armed forces diving
Special forces of Brazil
Brazilian Navy